Ferdinand Schureman Schenck (February 11, 1790 – May 16, 1860) was an American  politician who represented New Jersey in the United States House of Representatives for two terms from 1833 to 1837.

Early life and education
He was born in Millstone, where he completed preparatory studies. He studied medicine at the Columbia University College of Physicians and Surgeons in New York City, graduating in 1814.

He commenced practice at Six Mile Run, New Jersey (now Franklin Township, Somerset County, New Jersey).

Career

Congress
Schenck was a member of the New Jersey General Assembly 1829–1831. He was elected as a Jacksonian to the Twenty-third and Twenty-fourth Congresses, serving in office from March 4, 1833 – March 3, 1837, but was not a candidate for renomination.

After Congress
He later served as a trustee of Rutgers College, New Brunswick, New Jersey 1841–1861. In addition, he was a member of the New Jersey constitutional convention in 1844 and judge of the New Jersey Court of Errors and Appeals 1845–1857. He was an unsuccessful Republican candidate for the New Jersey Senate in 1856. He continued the practice of medicine and died in Camden, New Jersey in 1860.

He was buried in a private cemetery at Pleasant Plains, New Jersey.

External links

Ferdinand Schureman Schenck at The Political Graveyard
 

1790 births
1860 deaths
Democratic Party members of the New Jersey General Assembly
New Jersey state court judges
People from Franklin Township, Somerset County, New Jersey
People from Millstone, New Jersey
Physicians from New Jersey
Politicians from Somerset County, New Jersey
Democratic Party members of the United States House of Representatives from New Jersey
Jacksonian members of the United States House of Representatives from New Jersey
19th-century American politicians